María Eugenia Vidal (born 8 September 1973) is an Argentine politician who served as Governor of the Buenos Aires Province, being the first woman in the office, and the first non-Peronist since 1987. A member of Republican Proposal (PRO), she previously served as Social Development minister of the City of Buenos Aires, and in 2011 she was elected deputy mayor of the city under Mauricio Macri. Since 2021, she has been a National Deputy for the Juntos por el Cambio coalition.

During her time as governor, Vidal was called "the Argentine Margaret Thatcher" due to her tough position against Peronist-aligned teacher unions.

Background
Vidal was born in Buenos Aires. She was raised in the Flores ward and enrolled in the Pontifical Catholic University of Argentina, earning a degree in political science. She met Ramiro Tagliaferro, a classmate at the university, and they married in 1998; the couple has a son and two daughters.

She began her career in Grupo Sophia, a think tank founded by Horacio Rodríguez Larreta. She was named director of the group's social policy desk in 2000, as well as of Fundación Creer y Crecer, a think tank organized by Commitment to Change, a conservative political party led by mayoral candidate Mauricio Macri. She is also a member of Washington D.C. based think tank, The Inter-American Dialogue. Vidal was elected to the Buenos Aires City Legislature in 2003, and was appointed Chair of the Committee on Women and Youth. She served in the Human Resources Department at PAMI (the national health insurance service for the elderly and disabled), and as adviser to ANSES (the social security administration), as well as the nation's Ministries of Social Development and Foreign Relations.

Vidal was fielded in the Republican Proposal (PRO) party list as a candidate for a seat in the Argentine Chamber of Deputies for Buenos Aires Province in 2005, though unsuccessfully; she was later elected to the Buenos Aires City Legislature. The election of PRO leader Mauricio Macri as Mayor of Buenos Aires in 2007 led to Vidal's nomination as the city's Minister of Social Development. She requested maternity leave from the post ahead of her scheduled December 10 swearing-in for the birth of her third child, and took office on May 27, 2008.

Vidal's profile rose following the 2009 election of Deputy Mayor Gabriela Michetti to a seat in the Chamber of Deputies, and she became Mayor Macri's most visible female adviser. 
Following Macri's decision to forfeit a PRO candidacy for the 2011 presidential election, and instead seek a second term as mayor, he nominated Vidal as his running mate. The duo were reelected by a landslide on July 31, 2011, receiving over 64% of the vote with sociologist Daniel Filmus coming in 2nd place.

Macri selected Vidal as the candidate of his party to run for governor of the Buenos Aires Province in the 2015 elections. The Radical Civic Union, allied with PRO in the coalition Cambiemos, proposed to replace her with Ángel Posse, but Macri kept Vidal. In another negotiation it was proposed that Sergio Massa resigned as candidate to the presidency and ran for governor in Macri's ticket, but Macri kept Vidal as candidate again. She was the first female governor of the province, and it is the first time in 28 years that a non-Peronist candidate has won the election in the country's most populous province.

Governor of Buenos Aires

On December 10, 2015, she swore before the Buenos Aires Legislature.
Shortly after assuming as governor, she announced that she would live together with her husband, Ramiro Tagliaferro, in a special residence within the perimeter of the Morón military air base. Although she later divorced Tagliaferro, she continued to reside in the residence for security reasons after having been subject to police threats.

In April 2018, the Konex Foundation awarded her a Konex Award – Diploma of Merit in the Public Administrators category.

Cabinet
Vidal announced her cabinet on December 4. It is composed by politicians from the Republican Proposal, the Radical Civic Union and former members of Scioli's cabinet. 
 Federico Salvai, Minister of the Government
 Roberto Gigante, Minister of Coordination and Control
 Hernán Lacunza, Minister of Economy
 Cristian Ritondo, Minister of Security
 Edgardo Cenzón, Minister of Planification and Infrastructure
 Alejandro Finocchiaro, Minister of Education
 Alberto Mahiques, Minister of Justice
 Leonardo Sarquis, Minister of Agrarian Affairs
 Santiago López Medrano, Minister of Social Development
 Zulma Ortíz, Minister of Health
 Jorge Elustondo, Minister of Production
 Marcelo Villegas, Minister of Labor

Political views
She is in favor of the universal allocation per child, a social security program introduced during the Cristina Kirchner's government.

Vidal has also stated that she and PRO are against the Argentine price controls program, Careful Pricing.

She wants to reduce taxes and she did it in the Province of Buenos Aires.

The Spanish newspaper El País named her "the Argentine Thatcher" after Vidal's intense confrontations with Peronist unionists during her mandate.

References

External links

Official site 

1973 births
Living people
Governors of Buenos Aires Province
Politicians from Buenos Aires
Argentine people of Spanish descent
Pontifical Catholic University of Argentina alumni
Republican Proposal politicians
Women governors of provinces of Argentina
Members of the Argentine Chamber of Deputies elected in Buenos Aires
Women members of the Argentine Chamber of Deputies
Deputy Chiefs of Government of Buenos Aires
21st-century Argentine women politicians
21st-century Argentine politicians
Members of the Inter-American Dialogue